Famaillá is a city in the province of Tucumán, Argentina, located 30 km south from the provincial capital San Miguel de Tucumán.

The city is called the "National Capital of the Empanada". It hosts a festival dedicated to it every September.

The area hosts an experimental agricultural station of the National Institute of Agro-Technology (Instituto Nacional de Tecnología Agropecuaria, INTA). Its economy is based on exports of sugar and strawberry.

Famaillá was the site of the Battle of Monte Grande in 1841, between the forces loyal to Juan Manuel de Rosas commanded by Manuel Oribe and the League of the North, led by Juan Lavalle.

References

 
 Ruta0. Famaillá (brief travel and general information).
 INTA. Estación experimental Famaillá.

Populated places in Tucumán Province
Cities in Argentina
Argentina
Tucumán Province